Josef Bělohradský (9 December 1926 – 10 February 2006) was a Czech basketball player. He competed in the men's tournament at the 1948 Summer Olympics.

References

1926 births
2006 deaths
Czech men's basketball players
Olympic basketball players of Czechoslovakia
Basketball players at the 1948 Summer Olympics
Place of birth missing